The Château de Sauvebœuf is a château in the commune of Lalinde, Dordogne, Nouvelle-Aquitaine, France.

Châteaux in Dordogne